Ángelo Emanuel Gabrielli Scarrone (born 23 September 1992) is a Uruguayan professional footballer who plays as a right-back.

Career
Fénix were Gabrielli's first senior club. Having been moved into their senior team in the 2013–14 Uruguayan Primera División season, Gabrielli went unused on the substitute's bench four times before making his professional bow on 3 May 2014 at the Estadio Parque Capurro against Cerro Largo; Fénix ran out 5–1 winners. Thirteen appearances followed in each of the following three seasons, which preceded Gabrielli netting his first goal in a win over Plaza Colonia on 26 February 2017. January 2018 saw Gabrielli complete a move to fellow Uruguayan Primera División team Liverpool. Four goals in thirty-two games subsequently arrived.

On 4 January 2019, after departing Liverpool at the end of his contract, Gabrielli joined Newell's Old Boys of the Argentine Primera División.

In February 2021, Gabrielli returned to Uruguay when he joined Nacional. He left the club again at the end of the year.

Career statistics
.

References

External links

1992 births
Living people
Footballers from Salto, Uruguay
Uruguayan people of Italian descent
Uruguayan footballers
Uruguayan expatriate footballers
Association football defenders
Uruguayan Primera División players
Centro Atlético Fénix players
Liverpool F.C. (Montevideo) players
Newell's Old Boys footballers
Club Nacional de Football players
Expatriate footballers in Argentina
Uruguayan expatriate sportspeople in Argentina